Eight teams participated in the 2000 Women's Cricket World Cup in New Zealand, down from eleven at the previous edition in 1997.

Australia

England

India

Ireland

Coach:  John Wills

Netherlands
Coach:  Greg Curtain

New Zealand

Kate Pulford was originally named in the squad, but pulled out due to illness. She was replaced by Nicola Payne.

South Africa

Kerri Laing was originally named in the squad, but withdrew and was replaced by Hanri Strydom.

Coach:  Rodney Willemburg

Sri Lanka

Coach:  Guy de Alwis

External links
 CricInfo Women's World Cup statistics, ESPNcricinfo

Women's Cricket World Cup squads
squads